The Nissan Titan is a full-size pickup truck manufactured in the United States for the North American market by Nissan. It was named for the Titans of Greek mythology.


First generation (A60; 2003) 

Development of the Titan began in September 1999, with design work under Diane Allen. Giovanny Arroba's TA60 exterior was chosen in late 2000, with a final production freeze in July 2001. The design language of the future truck was previewed by the 2001 Alpha T concept shown at the 2001 North American International Auto Show, which had previously developed through November 2000.

Production began on September 21, 2003 and sales on December 1, 2003. The Titan used Nissan's new full-size F-Alpha platform. This new platform was shared with the Nissan Armada and Infiniti QX56 SUVs, with all three manufactured in Canton, Mississippi, United States. The first generation Titan continued without a major redesign through 2015.

Specifications

Models and equipment
The first generation Titan came equipped with a fully boxed ladder frame and was available in either rear-wheel drive or a shift-on-the-fly four-wheel-drive system coupled with a five-speed RE5R05A automatic transmission. An automatic brake-limited slip (ABLS) system was available on all Titans. The first generation was available as a King Cab (extended cab) or a crew cab with a full-sized back seat, with no regular cab being offered. The King Cab featured a  bed, while the crew cab had a  bed. In 2008, a longer wheelbase model was offered with either an  bed on the King Cab or a  bed on the crew cab. There were originally four trim levels available: the S, SV, Pro-4X, SE, and LE. The SE and LE trim was eventually replaced by the luxury SL trim. The S was the base model, the SV a mid-level model with more features, the Pro-4X was the off-road-oriented version, and the top level SL was offered with features like 20-inch alloy wheels as standard equipment.

Features

Features available on the first generation included:
 Bluetooth hands-free
 Navigation system
 DVD player with screen
 Side airbags
 Pro-4X off-road package
 Traction control
 Sunroof
 Big tow package with transmission temperature gauge and telescoping mirrors
 XM Satellite Radio
 Leather split power bench seat
 Utili-Track bed rail system
 Lockable bedside storage box
 Leather-appointed heated captains chairs with console automatic shifter
 Rear sonar warning system
 Automatic windows down with key fob
 Power adjustable pedals
 Flex fuel
 168-degree king cab rear door openings

Safety
The first generation Titan carried a five-star rating from the National Highway Traffic Safety Administration for driver frontal crash, and a four-star rating for passenger frontal crash.
 Vehicle dynamic control standard on 2010 models and up
 Side and front airbags standard on 2010 models and up
 Antilock brakes standard on all

2008 refresh

Second generation (A61; 2016) 

The second-generation Titan was to be a lightly reskinned, rebadged version of the Dodge Ram, but those plans fell through with the 2008 worldwide financial crisis.

Nissan unveiled the second generation Titan at the 2015 North American International Auto Show. The company targeted 5 percent market share, or 100,000 annual sales in U.S. Sales reached 21,880 units in 2016.

The standard engine is a 5.6-liter V8 gasoline engine. Additionally, through the end of 2019, the second-generation Titan offered a  Cummins 5.0-liter turbodiesel V8 that produces almost  of torque. The engine is referred to as the ISV.

The second-generation Titan is available in two forms, regular and XD. The XD version is built on a heavy-duty frame based on Nissan's commercial vehicle line and includes the Cummins diesel engine as an option. The platform is shared with the Nissan NV.

Three different cab styles are offered for the Titan and Titan XD: a two-door regular cab, four-door King (extended) Cab, and four-door crew cab. The four-door crew cab models were the first trucks to debut, followed by the King Cab and regular cab. Trim levels for the Titan and Titan XD are S, SV, Pro-4X (4X4 only), SL, and Platinum Reserve. The regular cab was only available with either S or SV trim levels, while the King Cab was only available with S, SV, or PRO-4X. The crew cab was available with all trim levels.

All Titan and Titan XD models come equipped with standard equipment such as Bluetooth for both hands-free calling and wireless audio streaming via A2DP, air conditioning, keyless entry, power windows and door locks, push-button ignition, and a rearview backup camera system. Options include a touchscreen audio system with GPS navigation (standard equipment for 2019), SiriusXM Satellite Radio, keyless access, an electronically-locking rear tailgate, remote start, alloy wheels, leather-trimmed seating surfaces with heating and ventilation, power front seats, a premium audio system, wood interior trim, a trailer tow package with integrated trailer brake control, and chrome front and rear bumpers and front grille.

For 2019, all Titan and Titan XD models received a new infotainment system as standard equipment, featuring GPS navigation, SiriusXM Satellite Radio, Apple CarPlay and Android Auto smartphone integration, and a seven-inch color touchscreen display, and the optional Rockford-Fosgate premium audio system was replaced with a new Fender premium audio system. This marks the first time a Fender audio system is available on a vehicle from a manufacturer other than Volkswagen.

2020 refresh 

For 2020, Nissan unveiled a refreshed Titan and Titan XD. For 2020, the regular cab model was dropped from both the standard and XD lines, and King Cab models of the Titan XD were no longer available. The 5.0 L Cummins turbo-diesel V8 engine that was available on the heavier-duty Titan XD was also discontinued, leaving only the 5.6 L "Endurance" gasoline V8. A new nine-speed Jatco automatic transmission replaced the previous seven-speed automatic transmission. The axle gear ratio on the standard Titan was also lowered from 2.93:1 ratio to 3.69:1. XD models gear ratio was lowered from 3.69:1 to a larger 4.083:1. New LED headlights were added to the front and rear of upper trims. A new optional 9-inch screen was added with high resolution as well as dual-panel panoramic moon roof. Safety upgrades include 360° safety shield standard which include lane departure warning, high-beam assist, auto emergency braking with pedestrian detection, rear auto braking, blind-spot warning, rear cross-traffic alert, traffic sign detection, and forward collision warning. Optional are intelligent cruise and intelligent driver alertness. Factory warranty was not changed from 100k or 5 years bumper to bumper.

The Titan lineup was discontinued in Canada after the 2021 model year, citing low sales figures as the cause.

Production 
In 2019, Nissan reduced production shifts of the Nissan Titan and Frontier pickup trucks from three to two in order to match demand and adjust inventory. About 700 contract workers were affected.

Sales

See also

Nissan Junior

References

External links

Official website(USA Nissan)
NHTSA crash test results

Titan
Pickup trucks
Flexible-fuel vehicles
All-wheel-drive vehicles
Rear-wheel-drive vehicles
2010s cars
2020s cars
Cars introduced in 2003
Motor vehicles manufactured in the United States